Somewhere Slow is a 2013 American romantic crime drama film written and directed by Jeremy O'Keefe.  It stars Jessalyn Gilsig, Graham Patrick Martin, David Costabile, Wallace Langham, Robert Forster and Lindsay Crouse. It had its world premiere at the 2013 Cinequest Film Festival and won Best Narrative Feature at the 2013 Brooklyn Film Festival.

The film was produced by Christopher Sepulveda and Michael Anderson of Logolite Entertainment, Jessalyn Gilsig's Lady in the Tree Productions and Jeremy O'Keefe's Tax-Free Films. The film was acquired by Screen Media Films and was released in the United States beginning on January 31, 2014.

Plot
In Wilmington, Delaware, Anna Thompson sells beauty products to doctors but her company lets her go when her performance is not up to par. She is a chain smoker and bulimic and feels the need to run away from her life. When she narrowly misses being the victim of an armed robbery in a store, she gets on a bus and travels to where her family used to have a vacation cottage in Massachusetts. Along the way she meets Travis (who calls himself Danny), who is also running away from his problems.

Cast
 David Costabile as Robert Thompson
 Jessalyn Gilsig as Anna Thompson
 Graham Patrick Martin as Travis Tratten
 Robert Forster as Chris Mc Conville
 Wallace Langham as Paul
 Lindsay Crouse as Katherine Franklin
 Melissa Claire Egan as Claire
 Denise Grayson as Dr. Diane Garland
 Blaise Godbe Lipman as Reilly Lewes
 Clifford Banagale as Sunshine

References

External links
 
 
 https://variety.com/2013/film/news/jessalyn-gilsigs-somewhere-slow-gets-distribution-exclusive-1200977052/
 http://martiniproductionsnyc.com/2013/06/13/actress-jessalyn-gilsig-on-producing-her-first-film-somewhere-slow/
 http://www.hollywoodreporter.com/video/somewhere-slow-trailer-667063

2013 films
2013 crime drama films
Romantic crime films
2010s English-language films